Structural maintenance of chromosomes protein 4 (SMC-4) also known as chromosome-associated polypeptide C (CAP-C) or XCAP-C homolog is a protein that in humans is encoded by the SMC4 gene. SMC-4 is a core subunit of condensin I and II, large protein complexes involved in chromosome condensation.

References

Further reading

External links
 
 
 PDBe-KB provides an overview of all the structure information available in the PDB for Human Structural maintenance of chromosomes protein 4 (SMC4)
 PDBe-KB provides an overview of all the structure information available in the PDB for Mouse Structural maintenance of chromosomes protein 4 (SMC4)